Protein phosphatase 1 regulatory subunit 3A is an enzyme that in humans is encoded by the PPP1R3A gene.

The glycogen-associated form of protein phosphatase-1 (PP1) derived from skeletal muscle is a heterodimer composed of a 37-kD catalytic subunit (MIM 176875) and a 124-kD targeting and regulatory subunit, referred to as PP1G by Hansen et al. (1995). 

PP1G binds to muscle glycogen with high affinity, thereby enhancing dephosphorylation of glycogen-bound substrates for PP1 such as glycogen synthase (e.g., MIM 138570) and glycogen phosphorylase kinase (e.g., MIM 306000). Phosphorylation at ser46 of the PP1G subunit in response to insulin increases PP1 activity, while phosphorylation at ser65 in response to adrenaline causes dissociation of the catalytic subunit from the G subunit and inhibits glycogen synthesis. 

Because of these functions, PP1G was postulated to be involved in noninsulin-dependent diabetes mellitus (NIDDM; MIM 125853) and obesity.[supplied by OMIM]
}}

References

Further reading